Gunnar Blomström is a retired Swedish footballer. Blomström made 21 Allsvenskan appearances for Djurgården and scored 4 goals.

References

Swedish footballers
Allsvenskan players
Djurgårdens IF Fotboll players
Association footballers not categorized by position
Year of birth missing